The following is a list of state highways in the U.S. state of Louisiana designated in the 900–949 range.


Louisiana Highway 900

Louisiana Highway 900 (LA 900) runs  in a north–south direction from LA 568 northeast of Ferriday to US 65 in Clayton.  The route's mileposts increase from the northern end contrary to common practice.

Louisiana Highway 901

Louisiana Highway 901 (LA 901) ran  in a north–south direction from LA 569 south of Canebrake to a local road at L'Argent.

Louisiana Highway 902

Louisiana Highway 902 (LA 902) ran  in a general southwest to northeast direction from a local road to LA 566 west of Clayton.

Louisiana Highway 903

Louisiana Highway 903 (LA 903) runs  in an east–west direction from the junction of two local roads west of Ferriday to a junction with the concurrent US 425/LA 15 in Ferriday.  The route's mileposts increase from the eastern end contrary to common practice.

Louisiana Highway 904

Louisiana Highway 904 (LA 904) ran  in a southeast to northwest direction from a dead end to a junction with US 84 west of Ferriday.

Louisiana Highway 905

Louisiana Highway 905 (LA 905) ran  in a north–south direction from LA 566 to a local road north of Elkhorn.

Louisiana Highway 906

Louisiana Highway 906 (LA 906) runs  in a general north–south direction from the concurrent LA 129/LA 565 in Monterey to a local road north of Monterey.

Louisiana Highway 907

Louisiana Highway 907 (LA 907) runs  in a southeast to northwest direction from LA 129 to a local road west of Monterey.

Louisiana Highway 908

Louisiana Highway 908 (LA 908) runs  in an east–west direction from a local road to LA 907 west of Monterey.  The route's mileposts increase from the eastern end contrary to common practice.

Louisiana Highway 909

Louisiana Highway 909 (LA 909) runs  in a north–south direction from LA 129 north of Acme to a second junction with LA 129 in New Era.

Louisiana Highway 910

Louisiana Highway 910 (LA 910) runs  in an east–west direction along Dora Knapp Road from an intersection with Black Hawk-Levee Road west of Shaw to a junction with LA 15 at Shaw.  The route's mileposts increase from the eastern end contrary to common practice.

Louisiana Highway 911

Louisiana Highway 911 (LA 911) ran  in a general north–south direction from LA 131 at Slocum to a second junction with LA 131 at Deer Park.

Louisiana Highway 912

Louisiana Highway 912 (LA 912) ran  in a southwest to northeast direction along Post Office Street from the Union Pacific Railroad tracks to a junction with LA 18 in St. James.

Louisiana Highway 913

Louisiana Highway 913 (LA 913) runs  in a north–south direction from LA 8 in Leland to the concurrent US 425/LA 15 at Peck.

Louisiana Highway 914

Louisiana Highway 914 (LA 914) runs  in an east–west direction from LA 913 south of Norris Springs to LA 8 west of Sicily Island.

Louisiana Highway 915

Louisiana Highway 915 (LA 915) runs  in an east–west direction from a local road northwest of Norris Springs to a junction with LA 916 northeast of Norris Springs.  The route's mileposts increase from the eastern end contrary to common practice.

Louisiana Highway 916

Louisiana Highway 916 (LA 916) runs  in a north–south direction from LA 8 west of Sicily Island to LA 913 north of Norris Springs.

Louisiana Highway 917

Louisiana Highway 917 (LA 917) ran  in an east–west direction from the junction of LA 913 and LA 916 to a local road northwest of Sicily Island.

Louisiana Highway 918

Louisiana Highway 918 (LA 918) ran  in an east–west direction from LA 15 to a local road north of Sicily Island.

Louisiana Highway 919

Louisiana Highway 919 (LA 919) ran  in an east–west direction from a dead end to a junction with LA 15 north of Sicily Island.

Louisiana Highway 920

Louisiana Highway 920 (LA 920) ran  in a north–south direction from LA 15 in Foules to a dead end north of Foules.

Louisiana Highway 921

Louisiana Highway 921 (LA 921) runs  in a general north–south direction from a local road southwest of Maitland to a local road north of Foules.

Louisiana Highway 922

Louisiana Highway 922 (LA 922) runs  in a northwest to southeast direction from a local road in Harrisonburg to another local road east of Harrisonburg.

Louisiana Highway 923

Louisiana Highway 923 (LA 923) runs  in a general north–south direction from a local road west of Jonesville to a junction with LA 124 at Wallace Ridge.

Louisiana Highway 924

Louisiana Highway 924 (LA 924) ran  in an east–west direction from LA 124 south of Wallace Ridge to a local road at Quaid.

Louisiana Highway 925

Louisiana Highway 925 (LA 925) ran  in a general north–south direction, looping off of LA 124 south of Jonesville.

Louisiana Highway 926

Louisiana Highway 926 (LA 926) ran  in an east–west direction from a local road to a junction with LA 564 south of Jonesville.

Louisiana Highway 927

Louisiana Highway 927 (LA 927) runs  in a general southeast to northwest direction from US 84 to LA 124 in Jonesville.

As designated in the 1955 Louisiana Highway renumbering, LA 927 originally comprised 13 different road segments in Jonesville.  By 1958, however, 11 of the hypenated routes were eliminated.  The remaining two (LA 927-1 and LA 927-13) were renumbered as one continuous un-hyphenated route.
LA 927-1 ran  along 1st Street from US 84 to Mound Street.
LA 927-2 ran  along Little River Road from Main Street to Front Street.
LA 927-3 ran  along 2nd Street from Mound Street to Front Street.
LA 927-4 ran  along Front Street from 1st Street to Little River Road.
LA 927-5 ran  along 3rd Street from Division Street to Mound Street.
LA 927-6 ran  along 9th Street from Willow Street to Front Street.
LA 927-7 ran  along 9th Street from Division Street to Willow Street.
LA 927-8 ran  along 10th Street from Main Street to Mound Street.
LA 927-9 ran  along Main Street from 10th Street to Little River Road.
LA 927-10 ran  along Division Street from 4th Street to Little River Road.
LA 927-11 ran  along Willow Street from 10th Street to Little River Road.
LA 927-12 ran  along Pond Street from 4th Street to Little River Road.
LA 927-13 ran  along Mound Street from 4th Street to 1st Street.

Louisiana Highway 928

Louisiana Highway 928 (LA 928) runs  in a north–south direction along Bluff Road from LA 74 west of Dutchtown to LA 427 northwest of Prairieville.

Near its northern terminus, LA 928 passes over without connecting to I-10.  It is an undivided two-lane highway for its entire length.

Louisiana Highway 929

Louisiana Highway 929 (LA 929) ran  in a general southwest to northeast direction from US 61 in Prairieville to LA 42 at Hobart.

Louisiana Highway 930

Louisiana Highway 930 (LA 930) ran  in a north–south direction from the junction of two local roads east of Prairieville to LA 42 west of Hobart.

The route was transferred to local control in 2019 as part of La DOTD's Road Transfer Program.

Louisiana Highway 931

Louisiana Highway 931 (LA 931) runs  in a general southwest to northeast direction from LA 44 north of Gonzales to LA 431 south of Port Vincent.

Louisiana Highway 932

Louisiana Highway 932 (LA 932) ran  in a north–south direction from LA 931 to a local road north of Gonzales.

It was an undivided two-lane highway for its entire length.

Louisiana Highway 933

Louisiana Highway 933 (LA 933) runs  in a general southwest to northeast direction from LA 44 north of Gonzales to LA 42 west of Port Vincent.

Louisiana Highway 934

Louisiana Highway 934 (LA 934) runs  in an east–west direction from LA 44 north of Gonzales to the junction of two local roads northeast of Gonzales. As of 2019, the portion east of LA 431 is under agreement to be removed from the state highway system and transferred to local control.

Louisiana Highway 935

Louisiana Highway 935 (LA 935) runs  in a general east–west direction from LA 44 in Gonzales to LA 22 north of Sorrento.

Louisiana Highway 936

Louisiana Highway 936 (LA 936) runs  in a general southwest to northeast direction from LA 22 north of Sorrento to a second junction with LA 22 at Acy.

The route initially heads southeast from LA 22 toward the New River.  It then turns north along the west bank of the river and intersects LA 937 before ending at a second junction with LA 22 at Acy.  LA 936 is an undivided two-lane highway for its entire length.

Louisiana Highway 937

Louisiana Highway 937 (LA 937) runs  in a general southwest to northeast direction from LA 936 south of Acy to LA 22 east of Acy.

It is an undivided two-lane highway for its entire length.

Louisiana Highway 938

Louisiana Highway 938 (LA 938) runs  in a northwest to southeast direction from LA 74 north of Gonzales to LA 44 in Gonzales.

The route initially heads south from LA 74.  It then follows a serpentine path east along Coontrap Road, south along West New River Street, and east across the New River to its terminus at LA 44 (North Burnside Avenue) in Gonzales.  LA 938 is an undivided two-lane highway for its entire length.

Louisiana Highway 939

Louisiana Highway 939 (LA 939) runs  in an east–west direction from LA 44 to US 61 in Gonzales.

The route heads east on East Worthy Road from LA 44 (South Burnside Avenue).  It then turns north onto Roddy Road and proceeds to a junction with US 61 (Airline Highway) shortly afterward.  LA 939 is an undivided two-lane highway for its entire length.

Louisiana Highway 940

Louisiana Highway 940 (LA 940) runs  in an east–west direction along West Orice Roth Road from South Darla Avenue to LA 44 in Gonzales.  The route's mileposts increase from the eastern end contrary to common practice.

It is an undivided two-lane highway for its entire length.

Louisiana Highway 941

Louisiana Highway 941 (LA 941) runs  in a general southwest to northeast direction from LA 44 south of Gonzales to LA 30 east of Gonzales.  The route's mileposts increase from the northern or eastern end contrary to common practice.

It is an undivided two-lane highway for its entire length.

Louisiana Highway 942

Louisiana Highway 942 (LA 942) runs  in a general east–west direction from the junction of LA 22 and LA 75 in Darrow to LA 44 in Burnside.

The route follows the east bank levee of the Mississippi River between Darrow and Burnside.  It is an undivided two-lane highway for its entire length.

LA 942 carries what was once a small piece of the Jefferson Highway auto trail, designated in 1916.  It was also designated as State Route 1 from 1921 until the 1955 Louisiana Highway renumbering.  US 61 followed the route from 1926 until 1933 when the Airline Highway was opened between Baton Rouge and the Bonnet Carré Spillway.

Louisiana Highway 943

Louisiana Highway 943 (LA 943) runs  in a general north–south direction from LA 308 southwest of Donaldsonville to LA 1 west of Donaldsonville.

The route heads west from LA 308 and immediately crosses both Bayou Lafourche and LA 1. It then turns to follow a northeast course to a second junction with LA 1 at McCall. LA 943 is an undivided two-lane highway for its entire length.

Louisiana Highway 944

Louisiana Highway 944 (LA 944) runs  in a general north–south direction from LA 1 to LA 943 west of Donaldsonville.

The route initially heads west from LA 1 as paved two-lane highway through an area known as Palo Alto.  It turns north onto the unpaved Palo Alto Road then northwest onto a second unpaved road to its terminus at LA 943 near McCall.

Louisiana Highway 945

Louisiana Highway 945 (LA 945) runs  in a general east–west direction from LA 308 to LA 3089 in Donaldsonville.

The V-shaped route heads southeast on Vatican Drive from LA 308, which follows alongside Bayou Lafourche.  It then turns northeast onto St. Patrick Street and dips underneath the Union Pacific Railroad tracks to its terminus at LA 3089 (Marchand Drive).

As designated in the 1955 Louisiana Highway renumbering, LA 945 originally comprised three different road segments in and near Donaldsonville.  By 1958, however, the three hypenated routes were renumbered as one continuous un-hyphenated route with the addition of some local road mileage.
LA 945-1 consisted of the St. Patrick Street railroad underpass.
LA 945-2 ran  along St. Patrick Street from 4th Street to what is now Vatican Drive.
LA 945-3 ran  along what is now Vatican Drive from St. Patrick Street to LA 308.

Louisiana Highway 946

Louisiana Highway 946 (LA 946) runs  in a north–south direction along Joor Road from LA 37 in Baton Rouge to LA 408 in Central.

It is an undivided four-lane highway with a center turn lane for its entire length. As of 2018, a portion of LA 946 is under agreement to be removed from the state highway system and transferred to local control.

Louisiana Highway 947

Louisiana Highway 947 (LA 947) ran  in a north–south direction along what is now North Sherwood Forest Drive from US 190 to LA 37 east of Baton Rouge.

Louisiana Highway 948

Louisiana Highway 948 (LA 948) runs  in an east–west direction along Highland Road from the junction of US 61 and LA 42 to a junction with LA 73 southeast of Baton Rouge.  The route's mileposts increase from the eastern end contrary to common practice.

It is an undivided two-lane highway for its entire length.

Louisiana Highway 949

Louisiana Highway 949 (LA 949) ran  in an east–west direction along what is now Hyacinth Avenue from LA 425 to LA 427 south of Baton Rouge.

See also

References

External links
Maps / GIS Data Homepage, Louisiana Department of Transportation and Development